Piero Raimondo Zacosta (1404 – 21 February 1467) was a Spanish knight of Aragon who served as the 38th Grand Master  of the Order of the Knights Hospitaller, from 1461 - 1467.

References

External links 
 http://www.netpages.free-online.co.uk/gms/gm038.htm

Grand Masters of the Knights Hospitaller
1467 deaths
Year of birth unknown